The Shanghai Spell is a 2002 film written and directed by Fernando Trueba. The film is based on the 1993 novel of the same name written by Juan Marsé. It is an international co-production among companies from Spain, France and the United Kingdom.

Plot
The film is set in the Gràcia district of Barcelona, in the wake of the Spanish Civil War. Fourteen-year-old Dani is a budding artist, who looks after Captain Blay (Fernando Fernán Gómez), an ageing civil war veteran. Blay suggests Dani draw local girl Susana as the subject of a poster warning of the dangers of factory smoke causing consumption. Dani and Susana begin a tentative romance, as they hear stories of Susana's father's exploits as a secret agent in the Chinese city of Shanghai from one of his wartime colleagues.

Cast

Production 
Based on the 1993 novel El embrujo de Shanghai by Juan Marsé, the screenplay was penned by the director Fernando Trueba.

Awards
The Shanghai Spell was nominated in several categories at the 17th Goya Awards in February 2003. The film won the awards for Best Art Direction, Best Costume Design and Best Makeup and Hairstyles; and was nominated for Best Original Screenplay, Best Cinematography, and Best Production Supervision.

See also 
 List of Spanish films of 2002

References

External links

2002 films
Spanish drama films
2000s Spanish-language films
Films directed by Fernando Trueba
Films set in Barcelona
Films set in Shanghai
Films about the Spanish Maquis
LolaFilms films
2000s Spanish films
2000s French films
2000s British films